Sandi may refer to:

People
Sandi (given name), a list of people and a fictional character
Sandi, better known as Szandi, Hungarian singer Alexandra Pintácsi (born 1976)
Sandi (surname), a list of people

Places
Sandi, Uttar Pradesh, town in Hardoi district, Uttar Pradesh, India
Sandi, Raebareli, a village in Raebareli district, Uttar Pradesh, India
Sandi, Jharkhand, village in Chitarpur, Ramgarh district, Jharkhand, India
Sandi, Estonia, village in Rõuge Parish, Võru County, Estonia
Nickname of San Diego, California, United States

See also
Sandy (disambiguation)
Sandie (disambiguation)
Sandhi
Sandis